Pingasa ruginaria is a species of moth of the family Geometridae first described by Achille Guenée in 1857. It is found in India, south-east Asia, the Ryukyu Islands and Sundaland.

The larvae have been recorded on Rhus, Liquidambar, Cinnamomum, Litsea, Crotalaria, Nephelium, Trema and Sterculiaceae species.

Subspecies
Pingasa ruginaria ruginaria (Guenée, [1858])
Pingasa ruginaria andamanica Prout, 1916
?Pingasa ruginaria communicans (Walker, 1860)
Pingasa ruginaria commutata (Walker, 1860)
Pingasa ruginaria interrupta Warren, 1901
Pingasa ruginaria pacifica Inoue, 1964

References

External links

Moths described in 1857
Pseudoterpnini
Moths of Japan
Moths of Africa